Uncle Sam is an iconic figure and a national personification of the United States of America.

Uncle Sam may also refer to:
Uncle Sam (comics), Quality Comics/DC Comics character
Uncle Sam (Vertigo), two-part comic book series by Steve Darnall and Alex Ross
Uncle Sam (diamond), the largest diamond ever discovered in the United States
Uncle Sam (film), a 1996 horror film
Uncle Sam (singer) (born 1971), American R&B singer
Uncle Sam (album), 1997
"Uncle Sam" (song) by Madness
Uncle Sam Cereal, a ready-to eat breakfast cereal
Uncle Sam (1852 sidewheeler), a side-wheel paddle steamer tug, first steamboat to ascend the Colorado River

Place
Uncle Sam, California, former name of Kelseyville, California
Uncle Sam, Louisiana, former name of Independence, Louisiana
Uncle Sam Plantation, a historic sugar plantation